Luteostriata ernesti is a species of Brazilian land planarian in the subfamily Geoplaninae.

Description 
The dorsal color is light-yellow with five dark longitudinal stripes: one median, two paramedian and two lateral. In most specimens the median and paramedian stripes are the thinnest and the lateral the broadest, but in some populations the paramedian ones are the broadest. The anterior end has a slight orange tinge and the ventral side is yellowish white.

Etymology 
The specific epithet ernesti honors the zoologist Ernst Marcus, who first described the species, but misidentified it as Geoplana marginata Schultze & Müller, 1858.

Distribution 
Luteostrata ernesti is found in Brazil, from São Paulo to Rio Grande do Sul, in areas of Araucaria moist forest, Subtropical Atlantic forest and Seasonal forests, as well as in old pine plantations with a well-developed understore understory.
It occurs in the São Francisco de Paula National Forest and in the São Paulo Botanical Garden.

References 

Geoplanidae
Invertebrates of Brazil